In mathematics, a scattered space is a topological space X that contains no nonempty dense-in-itself subset.  Equivalently, every nonempty subset A of X contains a point isolated in A.  

A subset of a topological space is called a scattered set if it is a scattered space with the subspace topology.

Examples 
 Every discrete space is scattered.
 Every ordinal number with the order topology is scattered.  Indeed, every nonempty subset A contains a minimum element, and that element is isolated in A.
 A space X with the particular point topology, in particular the Sierpinski space, is scattered.  This is an example of a scattered space that is not a T1 space.
 The closure of a scattered set is not necessarily scattered.  For example, in the Euclidean plane  take a countably infinite discrete set A in the unit disk, with the points getting denser and denser as one approaches the boundary.  For example, take the union of the vertices of a series of n-gons centered at the origin, with radius getting closer and closer to 1. Then the closure of A will contain the whole circle of radius 1, which is dense-in-itself.

Properties 
 In a topological space X the closure of a dense-in-itself subset is a perfect set.  So X is scattered if and only if it does not contain any nonempty perfect set.
 Every subset of a scattered space is scattered.  Being scattered is a hereditary property.
 Every scattered space X is a T0 space. That means there is neighborhood of x in X that does not contain y.)
 In a T0 space the union of two scattered sets is scattered. Note that the T0 assumption is necessary here.
 Every T1 scattered space is totally disconnected. (Proof: If C is a nonempty connected subset of X, it contains a point x isolated in C.  So the singleton  is both open in C (because x is isolated) and closed in C (because of the T1 property). This shows that every connected component of X has a single point.)
 Every second countable scattered space is countable.
 Every topological space X can be written in a unique way as the disjoint union of a perfect set and a scattered set.
 Every second countable space X can be written in a unique way as the disjoint union of a perfect set and a countable scattered open set.  (Proof: Use the perfect + scattered decomposition and the fact above about second countable scattered spaces, together with the fact that a subset of a second countable space is second countable.)  Furthermore, every closed subset of a second countable X can be written uniquely as the disjoint union of a perfect subset of X and a countable scattered subset of X.  This holds in particular in any Polish space, which is the contents of the Cantor–Bendixson theorem.

Notes

References 
 Engelking, Ryszard, General Topology, Heldermann Verlag Berlin, 1989. 
 
 

Properties of topological spaces